A Thorne–Żytkow object (TŻO or TZO), also known as a hybrid star, is a conjectured type of star wherein a red giant or red supergiant contains a neutron star at its core, formed from the collision of the giant with the neutron star. Such objects were hypothesized by Kip Thorne and Anna Żytkow in 1977. In 2014, it was discovered that the star HV 2112, located in the Small Magellanic Cloud (SMC), was a strong candidate. Another possible candidate is the star HV 11417, also located in the SMC.

Formation 

A Thorne–Żytkow object is formed when a neutron star collides with another star, typically a red giant or supergiant. The colliding objects can simply be wandering stars. This is only likely to occur in extremely crowded globular clusters. Alternatively, the neutron star could form in a binary system when one of the two stars goes supernova. Because no supernova is perfectly symmetric, and because the binding energy of the binary changes with the mass lost in the supernova, the neutron star will be left with some velocity relative to its original orbit. This kick may cause its new orbit to intersect with its companion, or, if its companion is a main-sequence star, it may be engulfed when its companion evolves into a red giant.

Once the neutron star enters the red giant, drag between the neutron star and the outer, diffuse layers of the red giant causes the binary star system's orbit to decay, and the neutron star and core of the red giant spiral inward toward one another. Depending on their initial separation, this process may take hundreds of years. When the two finally collide, the neutron star and red giant core will merge. If their combined mass exceeds the Tolman–Oppenheimer–Volkoff limit, then the two will collapse into a black hole. Otherwise, the two will coalesce into a single neutron star.

If a neutron star and a white dwarf merge, this could form a Thorne–Żytkow object with the properties of an R Coronae Borealis variable.

Properties 

The surface of the neutron star is very hot, with temperatures exceeding 109 K, hotter than the cores of all but the most massive stars. This heat is dominated either by nuclear fusion in the accreting gas or by compression of the gas by the neutron star's gravity. Because of the high temperature, unusual nuclear processes may take place as the envelope of the red giant falls onto the neutron star's surface. Hydrogen may fuse to produce a different mixture of isotopes than it does in ordinary stellar nucleosynthesis, and some astronomers have proposed that the rapid proton nucleosynthesis that occurs in X-ray bursts also takes place inside Thorne–Żytkow objects.

Observationally, a Thorne–Żytkow object may resemble a red supergiant, or, if it is hot enough to blow off the hydrogen-rich surface layers, a nitrogen-rich Wolf–Rayet star (type WN8).

A TŻO has an estimated lifespan of 105–106 years. Given this lifespan, it is possible that between 20 and 200 Thorne-Żytkow objects currently exist in the Milky Way.

The only way to unambiguously determine whether or not a star is a TŻO is a multi-messenger detection of both the gravitational waves of the inner neutron star and an optical spectrum of the metals atypical of a normal red supergiant. It is possible to detect pre-existing TŻOs with current LIGO detectors; the neutron star core would emit a continuous wave.

Dissolution 

It has been theorized that mass loss will eventually end the TŻO stage, with the remaining envelope converted to a disk, resulting in the formation of a neutron star with a massive accretion disk. These neutron stars may form the population of isolated pulsars with accretion disks. The massive accretion disk may also result in the collapse of a star, becoming a stellar companion to the neutron star. The neutron star may also accrete sufficient material to collapse into a black hole.

Observation history 

In 2014, a team led by Emily Levesque argued that the star HV 2112 had unusually high abundances of elements such as molybdenum, rubidium, lithium, and calcium, and a high luminosity. Since both are expected characteristics of Thorne–Żytkow objects, this led the team to suggest that HV 2112 might be the first discovery of a TZO. However, this claim was challenged in a 2018 paper by Emma Beasor and collaborators, who argued that there is no evidence for HV 2112 having any unusual abundance patterns beyond a possible enrichment of lithium and that its luminosity is too low. They put forth another candidate, HV 11417, based on an apparent over-abundance of rubidium and a similar luminosity as HV 2112. However, HV 11417 has since been identified as a likely foreground halo star.

List of candidate TŻOs

List of candidate former and future TŻOs

See also 
Quasar
 Quasi-star

References 

Star types
Stellar evolution
Red giants
Neutron stars
1977 in science
Hypothetical stars